Palla is an Afrotropical genus of butterflies in the subfamily Charaxinae. All four species exhibit sexual dimorphism.

Species
Palla decius (Cramer, [1777])
Palla publius Staudinger, 1892
Palla ussheri (Butler, 1870)
Palla violinitens (Crowley, 1890)

External links

"Palla Hübner, [1819]" at Markku Savela's Lepidoptera and Some Other Life Forms
 Images representing Palla at Consortium for the Barcode of Life

Charaxinae
Nymphalidae genera
Taxa named by Jacob Hübner